AISINDO is the Indonesian chapter of Association for Information Systems or AIS. Association for Information Systems (AIS) is the premier professional association for individuals and organizations who lead the research, teaching, practice, and study of information systems worldwide. AIS has members from over 90 countries, and comprises three regions: Region 1, the Americas; Region 2, Europe, the Middle East, and Africa; and Region 3, Asia and the Pacific. AISINDO was established on December 2, 2013 in Bali and was commemorated by the immediate past president, Prof Doug Vogel of City University of Hong Kong.
 
AISINDO aims to:
1. Promote the Information Systems as a discipline of knowledge, a research area, and organization practice in Indonesia.
2. Position Information Systems as a leading profession in the service of society in Indonesia.
3. Lead and promote excellence and a global standard in Information Systems education by adopting local values and context of Indonesia.
4. Explore and develop Information Systems research topics, theories,  technologies.
5. Facilitate a network development between AISINDO members and AIS members around the worlds.
6. Provide services and products to meet the diverse needs of members and Information Systems related communities in Indonesia.

The chapter is hosted by the Department of Information Systems, Institut Teknologi Sepuluh Nopember (ITS), Indonesia.
Website at http://aisindo.org/ 

Chapter President 2014 - 2018: Tony D. Susanto, Ph.D.

Professional associations based in Indonesia
Information systems
2013 establishments in Indonesia
Organizations established in 2013
Organizations based in Bali